T'Keyah Crystal Keymáh (born Crystal Walker; October 13, 1962) is an American actress and singer. In addition to her status as an original cast member of the Fox sketch comedy series In Living Color (1990–1994), Keymáh is also known for her roles as Erica Lucas on the CBS sitcom Cosby (1996–2000) Tanya Baxter on the Disney Channel sitcom That's So Raven (2003–2005) and the star and host on the Keymáh Network sketch variety show The Cool Crystal Show (2020–present).

Early life
Born Crystal Walker on October 13, 1962, in Chicago, Illinois, at Cook County Hospital, Keymáh was raised Catholic on the city's South Side. Her mother, Arlene Carter, a student at Chicago State University, died when Keymáh was two years old. Keymáh's father, William Walker Sr., was an Illinois state police trooper. He is of Seminole Indian descent from Springfield, Illinois. Keymáh was raised by her maternal grandparents Mary Louis Zeno, a social worker for the Illinois public aid department, and Carneil Carter, an insurance salesperson with Metropolitan Insurance. Keymáh began entertaining her family – singing, dancing, and reciting original poems and stories — at the age of three. Keymáh wrote her first play and her first song in elementary school. For high school, Keymáh is a 1981 graduate of the Academy of Our Lady. Keymáh performed with Ali LeRoi and Lance Crouther in the Mary Wong Comedy Group in high school, and then enrolled in Florida A&M University’s School of Business and Industry. In 1988, she adopted the stage name "T'Keyah Crystal Keymáh" after realizing her last name, Walker, reflected a slave name rather than her African roots. In Hebrew, "T'Keyah" means "mental revival of God's spirit" and "Keymáh" means "to establish oneself."

Career
During college and after graduation, Keymáh taught theater, dance, and mime. She has also done many theater performances, and produced and directed films. One of the original cast members of Fox Television's Emmy winning variety show, In Living Color, for five seasons Keymáh played a number of characters, including Cryssy, the central character of her self-written signature piece, "In Black World". She also sang and danced on the show. After In Living Color, she played contractor Scotti Decker in On Our Own; played comedy show writer Denise Everett on the 1996 TV series The Show; and provided the voices for Roz, Shavonne, Aki, Mrs. LaSalle, and many others in Waynehead. For four years, Keymáh was a series regular on Cosby, where she played flight attendant-lawyer-pastry chef-teacher Erica Lucas Hall. Following Cosby, she appeared for three seasons on the Disney series That's So Raven as Raven's mother, Tanya Baxter. In season four, her character was written out of the plot so that Keymáh could care for her ailing grandmother. Keymáh co-wrote and costarred in a two-person stage show with music, called Sellout!?!, with fellow College alumnus Bryan C. Jones, who was also one of the many guests to appear in her hit variety show T'Keyah Live! They did the first workshop presentation of Sellout!?! in 2013 at their alma mater. On June 21, 2022, Entertainment Tonight announced that Keymáh would reprise her role as Tanya Baxter on the That's So Raven spin-off, Raven's Home.

The Cool Crystal Show characters

 Nzinghi Anyemeechi Mbweli Aharanwa (Cooking with the Queen)
 Mrs. Dr. Eliza Madree Weaver (Read to Me)
 Jett
 Stand up T'Keyah (Standup Tragedy)
 Nylah 
 The Sisters
 Dr. Melanie Milan (The Milan Medical Moment)
 Miss Louise and Miss Ethel ("Ladies on the Porch")
 Mr. Z and Mr. Washington ("Men on the Porch")

In Living Color characters

 Cryssy (Black World)
 Hilda Hedley (Hey Mon)
 LaShawn
 Leslie Livingston (Homey the Clown)
 Mrs. Buttman (The Buttmans)
 Shawanda Harvey, host of Go on Girl

In Living Color impressions

 Shahrazad Ali
 Anita Baker
 Whoopi Goldberg
 Pam Grier
 Jackée Harry
 Janet Jackson
 La Toya Jackson
 Eartha Kitt
 Joie Lee
 Diana Ross
 Edith Bunker (All in the Family)
 Barbra Streisand

Other impressions

 Nell Carter
 Ruby Dee
 Macy Gray
 Katharine Hepburn
 Billie Holiday
 Harry Lennix
 Johnny Mathis
 Sidney Poitier
 Nancy Wilson

Don't Get Me Started!
Keymáh performed a solo stage work titled Don't Get Me Started! She sang, performed impressions, and talked about the prison industrial complex as well as conspiracy theories. She rewrote pointedly political lyrics to songs by Nina Simone and Eartha Kitt. She debuted the show in 2011 at The Black Academy of Art & Letters (TBAAL) in Dallas, Texas.

T'Keyah Live!
T'Keyah Live! is a variety show and is Keymáh's third self-produced theatrical show. It includes witty repartee, musical numbers, endearing characters, audience participation, impressions, video presentations, jokes and guests. She has performed the show across the U.S. since 1999 with a number of different guest performers, including Todd Bridges, T. C. Carson, Ralph Harris, Dawnn Lewis, and Karen Malina White.

Some of My Best Friends
Some of My Best Friends is a series of monologues in verse and prose embodied by a dozen diverse but somehow connected characters. In this humorous, tear jerking, thought-provoking theatrical production, Keymáh champions societal issues that are as relevant today as they were when the show debuted to sold out crowds at Chicago's South Shore Cultural Center in 1991. Overcoming obstacles, the devastation of AIDS, the search for love, race relations, and teen promiscuity are just some of the topics explored. The show was chiefly penned by Keymáh but includes pieces written by or in collaboration with Ali LeRoi, Harry Lennix, and poet Angela Jackson (And All These Roads Be Luminous: Poems Selected and New); and includes a dance choreographed by Maurice Hines. About her work in this show critics have said: "Keymáh is a Charismatic Actress... Chameleonic and Effervescent" – Los Angeles Times;"...Beyond Superlatives; She's Phenomenal!" – Earl Calloway, Chicago Defender; "Much More Than Comedy"- Lisa M. Pancia, New York Vignette; "...a Delightful, Multitalented Performer whose ability to create believable characters on stage is a Wonder to Behold"- Nat Colley, Los Angeles Reader; "Keymáh is Magnificent" – Linda Armstrong, Amsterdam News;"...Keymáh's Poignant, Detailed Portrayals are Never Less Than Magnificent"- Randy Trabitz, Los Angeles Weekly. The show garnered an AUDELCO Award nomination for Best Solo Performer, an NAACP Theatre Award nomination for Best Writing, and NAACP Theatre Awards for Best Performance and Best Play.

Personal life
Keymáh is an avid gardener and a vegetarian, as well as an active, Golden Life Member of Delta Sigma Theta sorority. She was initiated into the Beta Alpha chapter at Florida Agricultural and Mechanical University. Keymáh's brother is former Commander of the DC US Army National Guard, current Sergeant at Arms of the United States House of Representatives, the Honorable Major General William J. Walker.

Keymáh self-published three books: Cycle of Love: 28 Days Rejuvenation and Meditation for of Organization, Inspired Self Care, an inspirational self-help book with recipes, exercises and meditations; Some of My Best Friends: A Collection of Characters, the book version of the stage show she performed for ten years; and Natural Woman / Natural Hair: A Hair Journey – Hairstyles and Hairstories from the Front with Simple, Step-by-Step Instructions on Taking Care of your Natural Hair, an instructional hair care manual with anecdotes about her experiences with Afro-textured hair. She also contributed essays to "The HBCU Experience Book," "Dining with the Ancestors: When Heroes Come to Dinner," and "The Burden: African Americans and the Enduring Impact of Slavery."

Legacy
Musical artist Flyy Moon pays tribute to Keymáh's iconic "In Black World" performance piece, by including the opening lines in the intro of her 2021 debut song release, "Black." Associated Black Charities operates a donor-advised Keymáh Cultural Fund, which provides tickets to youth groups to attend theatrical performances and funds artistic groups that serve or comprise teens and children. There is a theater scholarship named for Keymáh at her alma mater, Florida A&M University. and medical scholarship named for her at Meharry Medical College.

Educator
T'Keyah Crystal Keymáh served as a K–8 substitute teacher for the Chicago Board of Education for 4 years. She has presented her "Tools of the Trade" actors preparation workshops at theatre festivals and other events in the United States, and she has lectured abroad. In the fall of 2017, Keymáh served as Florida A&M University's first ever W.K. Kellogg Foundation Artist-in-Residence in the College of Social Sciences, Arts, and Humanities Theatre department. Her residency included directing Pearl Cleage's The Nacirema Society Requests Your Presence at a Celebration of Their First 100 Years, teaching an Acting for the Camera course, and providing industry workshops and mentoring students.

Filmography

Film

Television

Video games

Awards

References

External links

1962 births
Actresses from Chicago
African-American actresses
African-American female comedians
American stage actresses
American television actresses
American voice actresses
American women comedians
Delta Sigma Theta members
Florida A&M University alumni
Living people
Miss Black America delegates
Comedians from Illinois
20th-century American comedians
21st-century American comedians
African-American beauty pageant winners
Former Roman Catholics
21st-century American actresses
21st-century African-American women
21st-century African-American people
20th-century African-American women
20th-century African-American people
20th-century American actresses